Hewa Bora Airways served the following destinations at the time of its demise:

Hewa Bora Airways